The 8th Thailand National Games (Thai: กีฬาเขตแห่งประเทศไทย ครั้งที่ 8) also known as the 1974 National Games and the 1974 Interprovincial Games) were held in Chonburi, Thailand from 3 to 9 December 1974, with 15 sports and representative from 10 regions.

Emblem
The emblem of 1974 Thailand National Games was an orange circle, with a Buddha statue on top, the emblem of Sports Authority of Thailand on the inside, and surrounded by the text .

Participating regions
The 8th Thailand National Games represented 10 regions from 71 provinces.

Sports
The 1974 Thailand National Games featured 11 Olympic sports contested at the 1975 Southeast Asian Peninsular Games, 1974 Asian Games and 1976 Summer Olympics. In addition, four non-Olympic sports were featured: badminton, sepak takraw, table tennis and tennis.

References

External links
 Sports Authority of Thailand (SAT)

National Games
Thailand National Games
National Games
Thailand National Games
National Games